Cheryl Chow, known professionally as Cehryl (stylized as cehryl), is a singer, songwriter, producer, and instrumentalist based between Los Angeles and Hong Kong.

Biography 
Chow was born and grew up in Hong Kong. She played classical piano from a young age, and learned to play guitar as a teenager. She studied music production and engineering at Berklee College of Music. Her Wherever it May be Be EP was made start from finish in her bedroom in Boston before moving to Los Angeles. She has toured with Still Woozy and Ravyn Lanae, and Raveena. Her tours with Jeremy Zucker and Cavetown were put on hold due to the COVID-19 pandemic. Her sophomore EP time machine is to be released in spring of 2021 with Nettwerk Records.

Artistry 
Chow records, and produces all of her own tracks. Complex featured her as one of the "Best New Artists of the Month" in July 2019, describing her sound as "more A24 than Marvel."

Still Loud reported that it only took Chow one and a half months to compose, write and produce the entirety of her second EP, Delusions.

Her song "angels (Emily)" was co-produced with Andrew Sarlo.

The 2020 music video for Moon Eyes was shot in Hong Kong as a collaboration between her and director Jonny Ho. She said she took influence from their favorite filmmakers, Frank Lebon, Ruff Mercy, and Wong Kar Wai.

Discography 
• time machine (2021)

• Slow Motion (2019)

• Delusions (2016)

References

Notes 
 http://thebaybridged.com/2018/06/05/the-multi-talented-cehryl-is-throwin-bos-june-centerpiece/
 http://www.nettwerk.com/news/2020/indie-rb-artist-cehryl-shares-new-track-and-diy-video%E2%80%82%E2%81%9F%E2%80%83%E2%80%83%E2%80%83%E2%80%86%E2%81%9F
 https://www.bandwagon.asia/articles/introducing-cehryl-rising-indie-artist-hong-kong-secret-signals-interview-december-2020
 https://hashtaglegend.com/culture/cehryl-cheryl-chow-rising-singer/

Living people
Women singer-songwriters
Singers from Los Angeles
Guitarists from Los Angeles
Year of birth missing (living people)